Amazon is a 2000 French film directed by Philippe de Broca and starring Jean Paul Belmondo.

It had admissions of 78,706.

References

External links
Amazon at IMDb
Amazon at Le Film Guide

Films directed by Philippe de Broca
French adventure comedy films
2000s French-language films
2000s French films
2000 films